Ain't That Good News is the eleventh and final studio album by American R&B and soul singer-songwriter Sam Cooke, released mid-February 1964, on RCA Victor Records, in both mono and stereo, LPM 2899 and LSP 2899. Recording sessions for the album took place at RCA Victor's Music Center of the World Studio in February (track 5) and December 1963 (tracks 1, 3, 11, 12) and January 1964 (tracks 2 and 6 to 10). The cover photo was taken by American photographer Wallace Seawell. Ain't That Good News was the final studio album to be issued during Cooke's lifetime, before his death at the age of 33. With the exception of "Another Saturday Night", which had been released as a single early in the previous year, Ain't That Good News comprised the first material that Cooke had recorded in the six months following the drowning death of his 18-month-old son Vincent.

The first album that Cooke recorded and released under his new contract with RCA, Ain't That Good News reached No. 34 on the Billboard Pop Albums chart. The album contains "A Change Is Gonna Come", one of Cooke's best-known songs. Though only a modest hit for Cooke in comparison with his previous singles, the song came to exemplify the Civil Rights Movement during the 1960s. The song has gained in popularity and critical acclaim in the decades since its release. By the time of its release, five of the tracks on Ain't That Good News had already or would later be released as singles. Ain't That Good News was reissued in hybrid CD/Super-Audio CD format by ABKCO Records in June 2003 with full music and session credits.

Music 

A record that featured one side of harder soul numbers and another of mellower ballads, much like R&B musician Ray Charles' Modern Sounds records, Ain't That Good News reflects Cooke's greater freedom in choosing material and sidemen. Therefore, it offered much pent-up emotional and musical expression, which was unique in the Cooke's output. Musically, Ain't That Good News features two sides of different stylistic approaches by Sam Cooke. According to record producers Luigi Creatore and Hugo Peretti, the first side of the album is "strong and rockin'," while the second side, "ballads....deep and soulful." They went on to write of the album:

Side one features the nostalgic "Good Times", written by Cooke, and "Another Saturday Night", which he wrote when staying in a hotel room where no female guests were allowed during a tour of the United Kingdom  The rolling chorus of "Meet Me at Mary's Place" was also written by Cooke about a gospel promoter in Charlotte, North Carolina where gospel groups often stayed. The country-style "Tennessee Waltz" is given new life here, while the title track, done out of the gospel tradition, would be his greatest hit until the central number on this album. "A Change Is Gonna Come", with its soaring gospel sound and powerful first-person language, was written in response to Dylan's protest anthem "Blowin' in the Wind" and became one of popular music's most well-known message songs, as well as Sam Cooke's signature recording.

Following the centerpiece are orchestrated ballads and standards that are arranged by conductor René Hall. Cooke gives the Irving Berlin tune, "Sittin' in the Sun", a powerful reading as he does with "Home". Ending on a somber and emotional note, the album closes with Sam Cooke's rendition of the traditional Appalachian ballad "The Riddle Song". According to string section leader Sid Sharp, Sam Cooke started to cry at the line "I gave my love a baby with no crying", which was reminiscent of the loss of Cooke's infant child, Vincent.

Track listing 
All songs written by Sam Cooke, except where noted.
Side one
 "Ain't That Good News" – 2:30
 "Meet Me at Mary's Place" – 2:44
 "Good Times" – 2:28
 "Rome Wasn't Built in a Day" (Sam Cooke, Beverly Prudhomme, Betty Prudhomme) – 2:34
 "Another Saturday Night" – 2:42
 "Tennessee Waltz" (Pee Wee King, Redd Stewart) – 3:12
Side two
"A Change Is Gonna Come" – 3:13
 "Falling in Love" (Harold Battiste) – 2:45
 "Home" (Jeff Clarkson, Harry Clarkson, Peter van Steeden) – 2:32
 "Sittin' in the Sun" (Irving Berlin) – 3:18
 "No Second Time" (Clifton White) – 3:03
 "The Riddle Song" (Traditional) – 2:30

Chart history

Album

Singles 

* Between late 1963 and late 1964, Billboard Magazine did not publish an R&B singles chart.

Personnel 
 Sam Cooke – vocals
 Chuck Badie, Buddy Clark, Ray Pohlman, Clifford Hils, Eddie Tilman  – bass guitar
 Joseph Gibbons – banjo
 Hal Blaine, John Boudreaux, Edward Hall, Earl Palmer – drums
 Norman Bartold, Le Roy Crume, Barney Kessel, John Pisano, Allen Reuss, Howard Roberts, Clifton White – guitar
 Emil Richards – marimba, percussion, timpani
 Linwood Mitchell – percussion
 Harold Battiste, Ray Johnson – piano
 Lincoln Mayorga – piano, celeste
 William Hinshaw – french horn
 Jewell Grant, William Green, Plas Johnson, Edgar Redmond, Red Tyler – saxophone
 Milton Bernhart, Ernest Tack, David Wells, John Halliburton, Harry Betts, Louis Blackburn, Streamline Ewing – trombone
 John Anderson, Melvin Lastie – trumpet
 Jesse Ehrlich, Emmet Sargeant – cello
 Harry Hyams, Alexander Neiman – viola
 Israel Baker, Robert Barene, Arnold Belnick, John DeVoogdt, William Kurasch, Irving Lipschultz, Leonard Malarsky, Jack Pepper, Ralph Schaeffer, Sid Sharp, Darrell Terwilliger, Tibor Zelig – violin
 James Bryant – backing vocals
 Gwenn Johnson – backing vocals
 Carol Lombard – backing vocals
 Robert Tebow – backing vocals
 George Tipton – backing vocals
 Jackie Ward – backing vocals
 The Soul Stirrers – backing vocals
 Luigi Creatore, Hugo Peretti – producer
 Dave Hassinger – recording engineer
 René Hall, Joe Hooven – arranger, conductor
 Jody H. Klein, Teri Landi – reissue producer
 Wally Seawell – cover photo
 Frank Driggs – photography (2008 import release)

Release history 
An official reissue of Ain't That Good News came nearly forty years after its initial 1964 release on LP format. The reissued compact disc of the album featured Super-Audio and Hybrid format, also known as Super High Material, which enhanced audio quality through the use of polycarbonate plastic. Using a process developed by JVC and Universal Music Japan and discovered through the joint companies' research of LCD display manufacturing, these CDs featured improved transparency on the data side of the disc, allowing for more accurate reading of the data by the CD player laser head. The reissues were fully compatible with standard CD players, and are listed below:

Notes

References

External links 
 Songs of Sam Cooke: Main Page
 Songs of Sam Cooke: Ain't That Good News

1964 albums
Sam Cooke albums
RCA Victor albums
Albums produced by Hugo & Luigi
Albums arranged by René Hall
Albums conducted by René Hall